Koçbaba can refer to:

 Koçbaba, Aşkale
 Koçbaba, Hazro